St. Francis' Church, Church of St Francis, or variations on the name, may refer to:

 St Francis' Church, Melbourne, Catholic church in Melbourne, Australia
 São Francisco Church and Convent, Salvador, Brazil
 St Francis' Church, Chester, Cheshire, Great Britain
 St Francis of Assisi Church, Stratford, London, Great Britain
 Friary Church of St Francis and St Anthony, Crawley, West Sussex, Great Britain
 St. Francis Church, Kochi, church in  Cochin, Kerala, India
 Templo de San Francisco de Asís, Guadalajara, Mexico
 Saint Francis of Assisi Parish, Karachi, Pakistan
 Franciscan Church, Zamość, Poland
 Church of São Francisco (Porto), Portugal
 St. Francis Chapel (Colonie, New York), United States
 St. Francis of Assisi Church (Manhattan), United States

See also
 Cathedral of St. Francis de Sales (disambiguation)
 Church of San Francisco (disambiguation)
 Saint Francis de Sales church (disambiguation)
 Saint Francis of Assisi Cathedral (disambiguation)
 St. Francis of Assisi Church (disambiguation)
 St. Francis Xavier Church (disambiguation)
 San Francisco Cathedral (disambiguation)

 :Category:Franciscan churches